The Catholic Club in Bangalore is a social association established by Bangalore Catholic Archdiocese in 1948, although its membership is not limited to Catholics. The club-house is located on Museum Road next to St. Patrick's church. The Catholic Club is notable for its Christmas ball and New Year's ball.

References

External links
 

Catholic lay organisations
Christian organisations based in India
Organisations based in Bangalore
Clubs and societies in India
Organizations established in 1948
1948 establishments in India